Donald Lee Totten (February 19, 1933 – April 2, 2019) was an American mechanical engineer and politician who served in the Illinois House of Representatives from 1973 to 1981 and in the Illinois Senate from 1981 to 1983.

Early life and career
Totten was born in Brooklyn in New York City. He lived with his family in Ridgewood, New Jersey. Totten attended Ridgewood High School in Ridgewood and Perkiomen School in Pennsburg, Pennsylvania. In 1955, Totten received his bachelor's degree in mechanical engineering from University of Notre Dame. In 1955 he moved to Illinois and worked as an industrial plant engineer.

Political career
He was involved with the Republican Party and with Schaumburg Township Republican Party Committee. Totten served in the Illinois House of Representatives from 1973 to 1981 and in the Illinois Senate from 1981 to 1983. In 1982, Totten ran for the Republican nomination for Lietuenant Governor, finishing third behind Susan Catania and Republican nominee George Ryan. He helped with the presidential campaigns for Ronald Reagan in 1980 and 1984, and served as the Illinois coordinator for the presidential campaign of Jack Kemp in the 1988 Republican primaries. He also served on the Regional Transportation Authority in Illinois.

Death
Totten died from heart failure at his daughter's house in Cornelius, North Carolina.

Notes

1933 births
2019 deaths
People from Ridgewood, New Jersey
Politicians from Brooklyn
Politicians from Cook County, Illinois
Ridgewood High School (New Jersey) alumni
University of Notre Dame alumni
American mechanical engineers
Republican Party members of the Illinois House of Representatives
Republican Party Illinois state senators